Hatcher station or Hatcher Street station is a DART Light Rail station located in Dallas, Texas. The station opened as part of the Green Line's expansion in December 2010.

DART owns several vacant lots next to the station that are planned to be used as a community garden for urban farming.

With Hatcher Street being renamed to Elise Faye Heggins Street, it is unknown if the station will change its name as well.

References

External links 
Dallas Area Rapid Transit - Hatcher Station

Dallas Area Rapid Transit light rail stations in Dallas
Railway stations in the United States opened in 2010
Railway stations in Dallas County, Texas